Pergamino Partido is a partido in the north of Buenos Aires Province in Argentina.

Settlements
Pergamino has 23  (districts):
 Pergamino: capital
 Francisco Ayerza
 Ortíz Basualdo
 Rancagua 
 Urquiza
 Maguire
 Villa Dafonte
 Fontezuela
 Manantiales Grande
 Manantiales Chico
 La Violeta
 Pujol
 Guerrico
 Manuel Ocampo
 Colonia Buena Vista
 J.A. de la Peña
 Acevedo
 Mariano Benítez
 El Socorro
 Arroyo del Medio
 Colonia Santa Rosa] 
 Mariano H. Alfonzo
 Pinzón

External links
 Pergamino Ciudad y su Región
 provincial site

Partidos of Buenos Aires Province
States and territories established in 1626
1626 establishments in the Viceroyalty of Peru